Cobb is an English surname of Anglo-Saxon/Old Norse origin.

Notable people with the surname "Cobb" include

A
Abbie Cobb (born 1985), American actress
Alex Cobb (born 1987), American baseball player
Alf Cobb (1892–1974), American football player
Alice Cobb (born 1995), British cyclist
Amasa Cobb (1823–1905), American politician
Andrew R. Cobb (1876–1943), Canadian-American architect
Arnett Cobb (1918–1989), American saxophonist
Artie Cobb (born 1942), American poker player

B
Betty Reynolds Cobb (1884–1956), American attorney
Billy Cobb (born 1940), English footballer
Brent Cobb (born 1986), American musician
Britt Cobb, American politician
Buff Cobb (1927–2010), American actress

C
Calvin Cobb (born 1853), American newspaper publisher
Camilla Cobb (1843–1933), American teacher
Catherine Cobb (1903–1995), British jeweler
Charles Cobb (disambiguation), multiple people
Charley Cobb (born 1929/1930), American football coach
Chester Francis Cobb (1899–1943), Australian-English novelist
Chris Cobb (born 1964), British computer scientist
Clinton L. Cobb (1842–1879), American politician
Craig Cobb (born 1951), American activist
Curt Cobb (born 1971), American politician
Cyril Cobb (1861–1938), British barrister
Cyrus Cobb (1834–1903), American lawyer

D
Darius Cobb (1834–1919), American painter
Daryl Cobb (born 1961), American author
Dave Cobb (born 1974), American record producer
David Cobb (disambiguation), multiple people
DeAndra' Cobb (born 1981), American football player
Denise LeClair Cobb, American anchor

E
Ed Cobb (1938–1999), American musician
Edmund Cobb (1892–1974), American actor
Edward Cobb (disambiguation), multiple people
Elijah Cobb (1769–1848), American sea captain
Ellen Cobb (born 1940), British judoka
Enoch Cobb (1797–1876), American businessman
Eunice Hale Waite Cobb (1803–1880), American writer
Evelyn Hey Cobb (1899–1972), British army officer

F
Fiona Cobb, British engineer
Frank I. Cobb (1869–1923), American journalist
Frederick Cobb (1901–1950), English politician
Freeman Cobb (1830–1878), American businessman

G
Gail Cobb (1950–1974), American policewoman
Garry Cobb (born 1957), American football player
Gary Cobb (born 1968), English footballer
George Cobb (disambiguation), multiple people
Gerald Cobb (1900–1986), English artist
Gerard Francis Cobb (1838–1904), English organist
Granger Cobb (1960–2015), American businessman
Guy Cobb (born 1963), American artist and entrepreneur

H
Hannah Cobb, American archaeologist
Harriet Redfield Cobb (1866–1958), American math professor
Harriet Sophia Cobb (1846–1929), New Zealand photographer
Helena Maud Brown Cobb (1869–1922), American missionary
Henry Cobb (disambiguation), multiple people
Herb Cobb (1904–1980), American baseball player
Howell Cobb (disambiguation), multiple people
Hubbard Cobb (1917–2006), American writer
Humphrey Cobb (1899–1944), Canadian-American screenwriter
Humphry Cobb (1873–1949), English cricketer

I
Irvin S. Cobb (1876–1944), American author
Isabel Cobb (1858–1947), American educator

J
Jack Cobb (1904–1966), American basketball player
James Cobb (disambiguation), multiple people
Janine O'Leary Cobb (born 1933), Canadian activist
Jeff Cobb (born 1982), American professional wrestler
Jelani Cobb (born 1969), American writer
Jennie Ross Cobb (1881–1959), American photographer
Jennifer Jo Cobb (born 1973), American race car driver
Jerrie Cobb (1931–2019), American aviator
Jewel Plummer Cobb (1924–2017), American biologist
Jia M. Cobb (born 1980), American attorney
Jim Cobb, American politician
Jimmy Cobb (1929–2020), American drummer
Jodi Cobb, American photographer
Joe Cobb (disambiguation), multiple people
John Cobb (disambiguation), multiple people
Joseph B. Cobb (1819–1858), American writer and politician
Josh Cobb (born 1990), English cricketer
Joyce Cobb (born 1945), American singer
J. R. Cobb (1944–2019), American guitarist
Julie Cobb (born 1947), American actress
June Cobb (1927–2015), American intelligence officer
Junie Cobb (1896–1970), American musician
Justin Cobb, British surgeon

K
Kay B. Cobb (born 1942), American judge
Keith Hamilton Cobb (born 1962), American actor
Kevin Cobb, American musician
Kim Cobb (born 1974), American scientist

L
Laura M. Cobb (1892–1981), American nurse
Lawrence Cobb (1894–1945), American politician
Lee J. Cobb (1911–1976), American actor
Leonie Cobb (1912–1984), British conservationist
Linda Cobb (born 1950), American journalist
Lorenza Cobb (1888–1953), American baseball player
Lyman Cobb (1800–1864), American author

M
Madeleine Cobb (born 1940), British sprinter
Margaret C. Cobb (1892–1975), American geologist
Margaret V. Cobb (1884–1963), American psychologist
Marvin Cobb (born 1953), American football player
Mary E. Cobb (1852–1902), American manicurist
Matthew Cobb (born 1957), British zoologist
Maud Barker Cobb (1872–1925), American politician
Melanie Cobb, American biochemist
Michael Cobb (born 1945), Australian politician
Michael Cobb (railway historian) (1916–2010), British historian
Mike Cobb (born 1955), American football player

N
Nathan Cobb (1859–1932), American zoologist
Ned Cobb (1885–1973), American farmer
Nelson Cobb (1811–1894), American judge
Noah Cobb (born 2004), American soccer player
Noel Cobb (1938–2015), American philosopher
Norah Marjorie Cobb (1899–1991), English toy maker
Norvell P. Cobb (1824–1879), American army officer

O
Omari Cobb (born 1997), American football player
Oscar Cobb, American architect
Osro Cobb (1904–1996), American lawyer and politician

P
Patrick Cobb, American army officer
Paul M. Cobb (born 1967), American historian
Price Cobb (born 1954), American race car driver

R
Randall Cobb (disambiguation), multiple people
Rebecca Cobb, British illustrator
Reggie Cobb (1968–2019), American football player
Regina Cobb, American politician
Richard Cobb (1917–1996), British historian
Robb Cobb (born 1999), New Zealand rugby union footballer
Robert Cobb (disambiguation), multiple people
Ron Cobb (born 1937), American cartoonist
Rufus W. Cobb (1829–1913), American politician
Russell Cobb (born 1961), English cricketer

S
Samuel Cobb (disambiguation), multiple people
Sara Miranda Maxson Cobb (1858–1917), American teacher
Seth Wallace Cobb (1838–1909), American politician
Stanley Cobb (1887–1968), American neurologist
Stanwood Cobb (1881–1982), American educator
Stephen Cobb (disambiguation), multiple people
Sue Cobb (disambiguation), multiple people
Silas B. Cobb (1812–1900), American industrialist
Silvanus Cobb (1709–1762), English naval officer
Sylvanus Cobb Jr. (1823–1887), American writer

T
Thomas Cobb (disambiguation), multiple people
Tim Cobb (born 1964), American musician
Trevor Cobb (born 1970), American football player
Ty Cobb (1886–1961), American baseball player
Ty Cobb (attorney) (born 1950), American lawyer

W
Wally Cobb (1870–1933), Australian rugby union footballer
Walt Cobb (born 1944), Canadian politician
Weldon J. Cobb, American author
Wilbur Cobb (disambiguation), multiple people
Will D. Cobb (1876–1930), American lyricist and composer
William Cobb (disambiguation), multiple people
Williamson Robert Winfield Cobb (1807–1864), American politician
Willie Cobb, American baseball player

Z
Zita Cobb (born 1958), Canadian businesswoman

See also
Cob (disambiguation), a disambiguation page for "Cob"
Cobbe, a page for people with the surnamed Cobbe
Cobbs, a page for people with the surnamed Cobbs
Cobby, a page for people with the surnamed Cobby
Justice Cobb (disambiguation), a disambiguation page for Justices surnamed "Cobb"
General Cobb (disambiguation), a disambiguation page for Generals surnamed "Cobb"
Governor Cobb (disambiguation), a disambiguation page for Governors surnamed "Cobb"
Senator Cobb (disambiguation), a disambiguation page for Senators surnamed "Cobb"

English-language surnames
Surnames from given names